Cachalia is a surname.

People with the surname 

 Amina Cachalia (1930–2013), South African activist and politician
 Azhar Cachalia (born 1956), judge of the Supreme Court of Appeal of South Africa and former anti-apartheid activist
 Ghaleb Cachalia (born 1956), South African politician and son of Amina Cachalia
 Ismail Ahmed Cachalia (1908-2003), popularly known as Moulvi, South African political activist

See also 

 Cacalia

Surnames
Surnames of Indian origin